Automeris randa, Rand's eyed silk moth, is a species of buck and io moths in the family Saturniidae. It was described by Herbert Druce in 1894 and is found in Central and North America.

The MONA or Hodges number for Automeris randa is 7745.

References

 Tuskes, Paul M.; Tuttle, James P. & Collins, Michael M. (1996). The Wild Silk Moths of North America: A Natural History of the Saturniidae of the United States and Canada, ix + 250.

Further reading

 Butterflies and Moths of North America
 Arnett, Ross H. (2000). American Insects: A Handbook of the Insects of America North of Mexico. CRC Press.

Hemileucinae
Moths described in 1894